Burnsville Alternative High School (BAHS) is a public alternative high school in Eagan, Minnesota, United States. It is part of the Burnsville–Eagan–Savage School District 191.

Students do not have to be residents of the school district to attend, and is an option for students in tenth grade or older who have dropped out of their previous school setting. A Burnsville High School diploma is available to all students.

Demographics
As of the 2017-18 School year there were 135 students attending Burnsville Alternative High School. 36% of students were Hispanic, 27% of students were White, 23% of students were Black, Asians made up 5%, and Native Americans were around 1% of the student population. 55% of students were male and 45% were female. 59% of students were eligible for free or reduced lunch.

References

External links 
 

Schools in Dakota County, Minnesota
Eagan, Minnesota
Public high schools in Minnesota
Alternative schools in the United States